Psephenothrips is a genus of thrips in the family Phlaeothripidae.

Species
 Psephenothrips cinnamomi
 Psephenothrips leptoceras
 Psephenothrips machili
 Psephenothrips moundi
 Psephenothrips strasseni

References

Phlaeothripidae
Thrips
Thrips genera